Exoplectra is a genus of lady beetles in the family Coccinellidae. There are about nine described species in Exoplectra.

Species
These nine species belong to the genus Exoplectra:
 Exoplectra aenea Fabricius, 1801
 Exoplectra angularis Mulsant, 1850
 Exoplectra bimaculata
 Exoplectra calcarata (Germar, 1824)
 Exoplectra coccinea (Fabricius, 1801)
 Exoplectra columba
 Exoplectra fryi Crotch, 1874
Exoplectra miniata Germar, 1824 
 Exoplectra rubicunda Mulsant, 1850
 Exoplectra schaefferi Gordon, 1985 (Schaeffer's lady beetle)

References

Further reading

 
 

Coccinellidae
Coccinellidae genera
Articles created by Qbugbot